Hip Hong is one of the 37 constituencies in the Kwun Tong District of Hong Kong which was created in 1994 and last held by nonpartisan Li-Ka tat.

The constituency loosely covers Cheung Wo Court and Wan Hon Estate around the Shui Ning Street, Hip Wo Street and Hong Wing Road in Ngau Tau Kok with the estimated population of 16,091.

Councillors represented

Election results

2010s

2000s

1990s

Notes

References

Constituencies of Hong Kong
Constituencies of Kwun Tong District Council
1994 establishments in Hong Kong
Constituencies established in 1994
Ngau Tau Kok